Emil Krastev (born 24 February 1977) is a Bulgarian boxer. He competed in the men's light heavyweight event at the 2000 Summer Olympics.

References

1977 births
Living people
Bulgarian male boxers
Olympic boxers of Bulgaria
Boxers at the 2000 Summer Olympics
People from Plovdiv Province
Light-heavyweight boxers